Derrick Johnson may refer to:
 Derrick Johnson (born 1982), American football linebacker for the Oakland Raiders
 Derrick Johnson (cornerback) (born 1982), American football cornerback for multiple teams
 Derrick Johnson (footballer) (born 1985), Costa Rican association football player
 Derrick Johnson (activist), elected President and CEO of the National Association for the Advancement of Colored People in October 2017

See also
 Derek Johnson (disambiguation)